Section 409 of the Packers and Stockyards Act regulates that meatpackers pay promptly for livestock that they purchase.

It requires that any meatpacker or dealer buying livestock to pay up in full to the seller before the end of the next business day.

409(b) states that the purchaser is exempt from this requirement if the parties have other payment agreements in writing.

History
The law was passed in 1921 as part of the Packers and Stockyards Act  (7 U.S.C. §§ 181-229b; P&S Act) which was passed in order to "regulate interstate and foreign commerce in live stock, live-stock produce, dairy products, poultry, poultry products, and eggs, and for other purposes."

Penalty
A dealer who violates the law could be assessed a fine not exceeding 32,000 dollars for each violation. When determining the amount of the violation, the secretary should consider the gravity of the offense.

Enforcement
The only time experts remember that a meatpacker was criminally charged for violating the law, was in 2010 when Sholom Rubashkin the CEO of agriprocessors was charged with failing to pay 31 cattle suppliers within 24 hours. Rubashkin at times paid as much as 11 days late  causing a loss of $3,800.51 of potential interest. Federal Judge Linda R. Reade added 4 years  in prison for this violation alone.

References

External links
 Packers and Stockyards Act, as amended, in HTML/PDF/details in the GPO Statute Compilations collection
 Packers and Stockyards Division of the USDA
 Regulations Under the Packers and Stockyards Act from the Legal Information Institute
 Regulations Under the Packers and Stockyards Act in the e-CFR

Food law
United States federal agriculture legislation